The 1943 Taça de Portugal Final was the final match of the 1942–43 Taça de Portugal, the 5th season of the Taça de Portugal, the premier Portuguese football cup competition organized by the Portuguese Football Federation (FPF). The match was played on 20 June 1943 at the Campo das Salésias in Lisbon, and opposed two Primeira Liga sides: Benfica and Vitória de Setúbal. Benfica defeated Vitória de Setúbal 5–1 to claim their second Taça de Portugal.

Match

Details

References

1943
Taca
S.L. Benfica matches
Vitória F.C. matches